Proteroiulus broelemanni is a species of millipede in the genus Proteroiulus.

Julida
Animals described in 1925